All Nighter or Allnighter may refer to:

 All Nighter (film), a 2017 comedy
 The Allnighter (film), a 1987 comedy
 The Allnighter (album), a 1984 album by Glenn Frey
 All Nighter (night bus service), a network in the San Francisco, California area
 Allniters, an Australian ska band
 WCW All Nighter, a series of professional wrestling specials
 "All Nighter", a song by Doja Cat from the album Amala (2018)

See also
 Voluntary sleep deprivation